St Mary's Roman Catholic High School may refer to:

St Mary's Roman Catholic High School, Chesterfield
St Mary's Roman Catholic High School, Lugwardine
St Mary's Roman Catholic High School, Croydon